Choe Hyo-won (Korean: 최효원, Hanja: 崔孝元; 20/23 February 1638 – 15 August 1672), of the Haeju Choe clan (Korean: 해주 최씨, Hanja: 海州 崔氏), was the father of Royal Noble Consort Suk and the maternal grandfather of King Yeongjo of Joseon. In February 1734, under Yeongjo's command, he was posthumously promoted to Chief State Councillor.

He was married to Hong Gye-nam's daughter, Lady Hong from the Namyang Hong clan. They had two daughters and one son. Their second daughter eventually became the birth mother of Yi Geum, King Yeongjo. During his lifetime, Choi Hyo-won served as a Deputy Apology Officer (행충무위부사과, 行忠武衛副司果).

He died on 15 August 1672, at the age of 35 and is buried in Jingwan-dong, Eunpyeong District, Seoul, near the tombs of Choe Su-gang, Hong Gye-nam and Hong Gye-ung. The tombs of Choe Tae-il and Choe Mal-jeong were located in Bulgwan-dong, Eunpyeong District.

Family
 Father: Choe Tae-il (최태일, 崔泰逸)
 Grandfather: Choe Mal-jeong (최말정, 崔末貞)
 Great-grandfather: Choe Eok-ji (최억지, 崔億之)
 Mother: Lady Jang of the Pyeonggang Jang clan (평강 장씨, 平康 張氏)
Grandfather: Jang Won (장원, 張遠)
 Wife
 Lady Hong of the Namyang Hong clan (남양 홍씨, 南陽 洪氏) (17 October 1639 – 18 December 1673)
 Father-in-law: Hong Gye-nam (1602 – ?) (홍계남, 洪季男)
 Mother-in-law: Lady Kim of the Gangneung Kim clan (강릉 김씨, 江陵 金氏)
 Children:
 Daughter: Lady Choe of the Haeju Choe clan (부인 최씨, 海州 崔氏)
 Son-in-law: Seo Jeon (서전)
 Granddaughter: Lady Seo (서씨)
 Grandson-in-law: Yi Hyeong-nyeon (이형년)
 Daughter: Royal Noble Consort Suk (숙빈 최씨, 淑嬪 崔氏) (17 December 1670 – 9 April 1718)
 Son-in-law: Yi Sun, King Sukjong of Joseon (조선 숙종 이순, 朝鮮 肅宗 李焞)
 Grandson: Prince Yeongsu (영수군)
 Grandson: Yi Geum, King Yeongjo of Joseon (조선 영조 이금, 朝鮮 英祖 李昑)
 Son: Choe Hu (최후, 崔垕)
 Daughter-in-law: Lady Ahn of the Sunheung Ahn clan (순흥 안씨, 順興 安氏)
 Grandson: Choe Su-gang (최수강, 崔壽崗) (? – 21 December 1749)
 Granddaughter-in-law: Lady Kim (김씨)
 Great-grandson: Choe Jin-hae (최진해, 崔鎭海)
 Great-grandson: Choe Jin-hyeong (최진형, 崔鎭衡)
 Granddaughter: Lady Choe of the Haeju Choe clan (부인 최씨, 海州 崔氏)
 Grandson-in-law: Jo Tae-hang (조태항)
 Unnamed great-grandson
 Great-granddaughter: Lady Jo (조씨)
 Great-granddaughter: Lady Jo (조씨)

In popular culture
Portrayed by Lee Hee-do in the 1988 MBC TV series 500 Years of Joseon: Queen In Hyun.
Portrayed by Kang Man-hee in the 2002–2003 KBS TV series Jang Hee Bin.
Portrayed by Chun Ho-jin in the 2010 MBC TV series Dong Yi.

References

17th-century Korean people
1638 births
1672 deaths
Choe clan of Haeju